The Global Awards are held by Global Media & Entertainment and reward music played on the British radio stations which are part of the Global network, including Capital, Capital XTRA, Heart, Classic FM, Smooth, Radio X, LBC and Gold, with the awards categories reflecting the songs, artists, programmes and news aired on each station.

List of ceremonies

2018 

The Global Awards 2018 ceremony was held on Thursday 1 March 2018 at London's Eventim Apollo.

It started at 7:30 pm and was shown live on Capital TV and Heart TV. It was also available to watch on the Capital FM Website, on all the socials and on the radio. The Capital FM Global Awards radio schedule was as follows: Backstage on Capital Drive Time from 4pm GMT until 7pm GMT and then JJ, live from backstage from 7pm GMT chatting to the guests.

Performances and special appearances from Sam Smith, Rita Ora, Kasabian, Martin Garrix, Andrea Bocelli and Liam Payne.

Roman Kemp, Rochelle Humes and Myleene Klass hosted the ceremony.

2019 

The Global Awards 2019 was held at London’s Eventim Apollo on March 7. There were performances and guest appearances from Little Mix, Lang Lang, Blossoms, Anne-Marie, Mark Ronson and Mabel. Roman Kemp, Rochelle Humes and Myleene Klass returned to host the ceremony.

2020 

The Global Awards 2020 was held at London's Eventim Apollo on 5 March 2020. There were performances and guest appearances from Ellie Goulding, Camila Cabello, Aitch, Stereophonics, Tones and I, Aled Jones and Russell Watson. Roman Kemp and Myleene Klass returned to host and were joined by new co-host Kate Garraway who replaced Rochelle Humes.

2021 
The Global Awards 2021 was not held in a physical location due to COVID-19 pandemic in the United Kingdom. The awards ceremony did not publish a list of nominees as in previous editions, announcing the winners through the company's official website and on socialnetwork pages. The list of winners is below:

 Best Female – Dua Lipa
 Best Male – Harry Styles
 Best Group – Little Mix
 Best Britisch Act – Dua Lipa
 Best Classical Artist – The Kanneh-Masons
 Best Hip-Hop or R&B – Cardi B
 Best Indie Act – Nothing but Thieves
 Rising Star Award – Joel Corry
 Best Podcast – ‘Hunting Ghislaine’
 Most Played Song – "Don't Start Now" by Dua Lipa

2022 

The Global Awards 2022 was not held in a physical location due to the ongoing effects of the COVID-19 pandemic in the United Kingdom. Winners were announced through the company's official website and on social network pages on 14 April 2022.

Categories

 Public vote
 Jury vote
 Not awarded

The Global Special Award
Liam Payne (2018)
Mark Ronson (2019)
Stereophonics (2020)

Special Award for Creativity 

Lil Nas X (2022)

Best News Interview, Moment or Debate
First Responders (2018)

The Very Award 
Joshua Hill (2019)
Andy Smith (co-founder of Regenerate Charity) (2020)

Most nominated and awarded acts

Most nominated

Most wins

Voting procedure
According to the Global Awards website, the voters used a secure online website to vote in 2018. Each voter was allowed to vote up to 5 times. To date, categories are judged by music industry representatives.

See also
Global

References

External links

Global Radio
British music awards
Awards established in 2018
2018 establishments in the United Kingdom